CD46 complement regulatory protein also known as CD46 (cluster of differentiation 46) and Membrane Cofactor Protein is a protein which in humans is encoded by the CD46 gene. CD46 is an inhibitory complement receptor.

Gene 

This gene is found in a cluster on chromosome 1q32 with other genes encoding structural components of the complement system. At least fourteen different transcript variants encoding fourteen different isoforms have been found for this gene.

Function 

The protein encoded by this gene is a type I membrane protein and is a regulatory part of the complement system.

The encoded protein has cofactor activity for inactivation (through cleavage) of complement components C3b and C4b by serum factor I, which protects the host cell from damage by complement.

The protein encoded by this gene may be involved in the fusion of the spermatozoa with the oocyte during fertilization.

Clinical significance 

The encoded protein can act as a receptor for the Edmonston strain of measles virus, human herpesvirus-6 (HHV-6), group B adenoviruses, and type IV pili of pathogenic Neisseria.

The extracellular region of CD46 contains four short consensus repeats (SCR) of about 60 amino acids that fold into a compact beta-barrel domain surrounded by flexible loops. As has been demonstrated for CD46 with other ligands, the CD46 protein structure is believed to linearize upon binding HHV-6. While their precise interaction has not yet been determined, the second and third SCR domains have been demonstrated to be required for HHV-6 receptor binding and cellular entry. The heterotetramer gH/gL/gQ1/gQ2 complex of HHV-6 has been identified as a CD46 ligand.

Established medulloblastoma (a malignant brain tumor common in childhood) specimens express CD46, and that medulloblastoma specimens removed from patients had a high level of CD46 expression. Therefore, a vaccine made of the Edmonston strain of measles virus could treat the medulloblastoma. Such a vaccine has already been tested in a number of trials involving other tumor types which have a high expression of CD46, including one type of adult brain tumor.

Recently, CD46 has emerged as a promising target for the treatment of both adenocarcinoma and neuroendocrine types of metastatic castration-resistant prostate cancer (mCRPC). YS5, a human full-length IgG1 with high specificity for CD46, was identified to have high binding affinity for prostate cancer tissue. YS5 has been developed into an antibody-drug conjugate, FOR46, which is currently in a phase I clinical trial (NCT03575819) for the treatment of mCRPC. Since then, a companion molecular imaging agent for CD46-targeted therapy has been developed.

Interactions 

CD46 has been shown to interact with CD9, CD151 and CD29.

References

External links
  GeneReviews/NCBI/NIH/UW entry on Atypical Hemolytic-Uremic Syndrome
  OMIM entries on Atypical Hemolytic-Uremic Syndrome
 
 
 

Clusters of differentiation